Carolina Solberg Salgado (born August 6, 1987 in Rio de Janeiro) is a Brazilian beach volleyball player.

Salgado is considered to be one of the sports up-and-coming stars, having made an impression on a number of local Brazilian tournaments and several overseas beach volleyball tours. She won a gold medal in the 2004 FIVB Under-18 World Championship and again in the Under-21 World Championship in 2005.

Her elder sister Maria Clara Salgado is also a successful beach volleyball player, as was their mother, Isabel, in past years.

Salgado is married to art director Fernando Young, co-winner of the 2013 Latin Grammy for Best Recording Package.

Opposition to[Jair Bolsonaro
In 2020, Salgado was punished by the Brazilian Superior Court of Sports Justice (Superior Tribunal de Justiça Desportiva) for shouting "Bolsonaro, out!" during a live interview. She was fined 100,000 reais and was suspended for 6 games. She protested the punishment and in a second trial she was absolved of all charges. The Brazilian Volleyball Confederation accused her of “staining the sport”, even though many other volleyball players have consistently showed support for Bolsonaro without any repercussions or reprimands.

References

Brazilian women's beach volleyball players
Brazilian people of German descent
1987 births
Living people
Brazilian women's volleyball players
Volleyball players from Rio de Janeiro (city)
21st-century Brazilian women